Turneria bidentata is a species of ant in the genus Turneria. Described by Forel in 1895, the species is endemic to Australia, mostly found in the north ends of the country.

References

External links

Dolichoderinae
Insects described in 1895
Hymenoptera of Australia